The Department of Economic Development is the department of the South African government responsible for economic policy, economic planning and economic development. It was established in 2009 after the election of President Jacob Zuma.

 the Minister of Economic Development is Ebrahim Patel and his deputy is Madala Masuku. In the 2011/12 budget the department had a budget of R595 million and a staff complement of 45 civil servants.

References

External links
 Official website 

Economic Development
South Africa
Economy of South Africa